Sviliukai (formerly) is a village in Kėdainiai district municipality, in Kaunas County, in central Lithuania. According to the 2011 census, the village had a population of 10 people. The Pernarava-Šaravai Forest is next to Sviliai. 

A former manor site is located in Sviliukai, by the Žagrupis rivulet (a cultural heritage object).

Demography

References

Villages in Kaunas County
Kėdainiai District Municipality